Stenocalama is a monotypic moth genus of the family Crambidae described by George Hampson in 1919. Its only species, Stenocalama ochrotis, described by the same author in the same year, is found in Uganda.

The wingspan is about 16 mm. The forewings are whitish, suffused with rufous. The hindwings are white, the costal area tinged with rufous.

References

Endemic fauna of Uganda
Schoenobiinae
Crambidae genera
Taxa named by George Hampson